Mount Magnificent Conservation Park (formerly Mount Magnificent National Park) is a protected area in the Australian state of South Australia located in the Mount Lofty Ranges about  south of the state capital of Adelaide. It is located within the gazetted locality of Mount Magnificent.

The conservation park consists of land in section 293 in the cadastral unit of the Hundred of Kuitpo. It came into existence on 10 August 1967 as a national park by proclamation under the National Parks Act 1966 as the Mount Magnificent National Park. On 27 April 1972, it was reconstituted as the Mount Magnificent Conservation Park upon the proclamation of the National Parks and Wildlife Act 1972. Its name is derived from the mountain called Mount Magnificent which is located within its boundaries.

The conservation park is bounded to the west by the Blackfellows Creek Road and to the east by the Mount Magnificent Road. The Heysen Trail, the long distance walking trail, passes through the middle of the conservation park entering from the east via Mount Magnificent Road and exiting in the north-west corner onto Blackfellows Creek Road.

In 1980, it was described as follows:Mount Magnificent Conservation Park comprises the north-western slopes of Mount Magnificent which rises to 380m above sea level. The relatively flat land along the western boundary of the park carries stringybark low open forest (Eucalyptus baxteri, E obliqua). With increasing gradient in an easterly direction, trees of E fasciculosa, E leucoxylon and E huberana form a woodland formation with a grassy understorey. Walking tracks provide access for visitors to the park. The stringybark association which occupies the lower elevations of the park contains a great variety of sclerophyllous shrubs including the two species of Banksia which occur in South Australia.

The conservation park is classified as an IUCN Category III protected area. In 1980, it was listed on the now-defunct Register of the National Estate.

See also
Protected areas of South Australia
Finniss Conservation Park

References

External links
Mount Magnificent Conservation Park webpage on protected planet
Mount Magnificent Conservation Park webpage on the BirdsSA website

Conservation parks of South Australia
Protected areas established in 1967
1967 establishments in Australia
South Australian places listed on the defunct Register of the National Estate